David Henrique dos Santos (born 19 March 1990 in Maceió) is a Brazilian footballer who currently plays as a defensive midfielder.

Manteiga formerly played for Gama in his country Brazil before signing for Feyenoord in 2008. After loan spells Excelsior and Ponte Preta he returned to Brazil to play for Grêmio Prudente.

References

External links

1990 births
Living people
Brazilian footballers
Association football midfielders
Esporte Clube Vitória players
Criciúma Esporte Clube players
Sociedade Esportiva do Gama players
CR Vasco da Gama players
Feyenoord players
Associação Atlética Ponte Preta players
Grêmio Barueri Futebol players
Eredivisie players
Brazilian expatriate footballers
Expatriate footballers in the Netherlands
People from Maceió
Sportspeople from Alagoas